The Smoky Hills Wind Farm (Phase I & Phase II) is a 250 megawatt (MW) wind farm in Lincoln and Ellsworth Counties, 140 miles west of Topeka in Kansas, north of Ellsworth. The farm is operated by Enel Green Power. Highway K-14 and Interstate 70 pass through parts of the wind farm, with clear views of many of the wind turbines. The project uses 56 Vestas V80 1.8 MW wind turbines and produces enough electricity to power some 37,000 average Kansas homes annually. , phase II is under construction with 99 GE 1.5 MW wind turbines for an additional 148.5 MW, to bring the total nameplate capacity to 249.3 MW. 
Phase II was completed and began commercial operation in December 2008.

See also

Elk River Wind Project

References

External links

Buildings and structures in Ellsworth County, Kansas
Energy infrastructure completed in 2009
Buildings and structures in Lincoln County, Kansas
Wind farms in Kansas